Frank Wolf may refer to:

 Frank Wolf (adventurer) (born 1970), Canadian environmentalist
 Frank Wolf (politician) (born 1939), U.S. Representative
 Frank N. Wolf (1897–1949), American football and basketball player

See also 
 Frank Wolfe (disambiguation) 
 Frank Wolff (disambiguation)